Louis Landweber (8 January 1912, New York City – 19 January 1998, Iowa City, Iowa), was a leading ship hydrodynamicist, known for Landweber iteration.

Education and career
Landweber received in 1932 a bachelor's degree in mathematics from the City College of New York. After graduation, he became a physicist at the United States Experimental Model Basin at the Washington Navy Yard. He received a master's degree in physics from George Washington University. Starting in 1940, he led a research group for mine-sweeping and other war-related activities. He received a Ph.D. in physics from the University of Maryland and was promoted to the head of the hydrodynamics division of the David Taylor Model Basin in Carderock, Maryland, before leaving for a professorship at the University of Iowa. There he was a research engineer at the Iowa Institute of Hydraulic Research as well as a professor of mechanics and hydraulics at the University of Iowa, where he remained until his retirement in 1982.

Upon his death he was survived by his wife, two sons, and four grandchildren. His elder son is the mathematician Peter Landweber (born 1940) and his younger son is the photographer Victor Landweber (born 1943).

Awards and honors
1947 — U. S. Navy's Distinguished Meritorious Civilian Service Award
1978 — David W. Taylor Lecturer at the David W. Taylor Naval Ship Research and Development Center
1978 — Davidson Medal from the Society of Naval Architects and Marine Engineers
1979 — special conference organized in his honor, the Third Engineering Mechanics Division Specialty Conference of the American Society of Civil Engineers
1980 — election to the National Academy of Engineers
1993 — Sixth International Conference on Numerical Ship Hydrodynamics held in his honor in Iowa City

References

1912 births
1998 deaths
20th-century American engineers
American marine engineers
City College of New York alumni
Columbian College of Arts and Sciences alumni
University System of Maryland alumni
University of Iowa faculty
Members of the United States National Academy of Engineering